The Palace of the Counts of Cocentaina, located in the municipality of Cocentaina, Alicante, Spain, is a 14th-century medieval building. This building originated as an old fortress with four halls and four towers on donjons crowned by merlons.

The art gallery of the palace shows works with artistic value such as the gothic altarpiece of Saint Barbara or the altarpiece of Saint Anthony by Nicolás Borrás and a sacred Bible from the 15th century.

Bibliography 
Guía de Arquitectura de la Provincia de Alicante. 
PAREDES VAÑÓ, Enric (2011), "Aproximación a la arquitectura de las fortificaciones en las montañas del valle central del Serpis. Las Torres". Actas del Séptimo Congreso Nacional de Historia de la Construcción. Instituto Juan de Herrera - Madrid - 2011.  | 2 vols., 146 comunicaciones, 1507 pp.

See also 

 Route of the Valencian classics

External links 
The Palace of the Counts of Cocentaina at Cocentaina Tourist Office 

Bien de Interés Cultural landmarks in the Province of Alicante
Palaces in the Valencian Community